Dlinza Forest Nature Reserve, is located just outside Eshowe, in the KwaZulu-Natal, province of South Africa. This nature reserve is about 250 Ha in area.

Dlinza Forest lies on a crown made of several hills and reaches a height of 500 m above sea level. The reserve features many tall trees and streams. 60 bird species, duikers, Cape bushbucks, vervet monkey, wild boars, and other animals live here. An elevated 125-m-long trail and a 20-m-high lookout tower offer a view of the forest canopy and give a view of the coast. There are two trails.

Due to its higher altitude, it is cooler than Eshowe. Therefore, the Zulu kings often preferred to stay there. During some of the wars in which the Zulu fought, the forest served as a hideout.

References

See also
 Protected areas of South Africa

Protected areas of KwaZulu-Natal